Kenedy County is a county located in the U.S. state of Texas. As of the 2020 census, its population was 350. It is the third-least populous county in Texas and fourth-least populous in the United States. Its county seat is Sarita. The county was created in 1921 from parts of Hidalgo and Willacy counties and is named for Mifflin Kenedy, an early area rancher and steamboat operator.

Kenedy County is included in the Kingsville, TX Kingsville Micropolitan Statistical Area, which is also included in the Corpus Christi-Kingsville-Alice, TX Combined Statistical Area. There are no incorporated municipalities in Kenedy County.

In 1999, Hurricane Bret struck the county, but damage was minimal due to the sparse population. The Peñascal Wind Power Project was built near Sarita in the early 21st Century and is expected to slightly raise the population of the area.

The King Ranch, of which Mifflin Kenedy had been a partner prior to 1868, covers a large part of the county.

Geography
In total area, Kenedy is the 13th largest county in Texas. In land area only, it is the 25th-largest county in Texas. It borders the Gulf of Mexico. Baffin Bay makes up much of the border with Kleberg County.

Major highways
US 77 is the only highway (federal or state) in Kenedy County.
  U.S. Highway 77
  Interstate 69E is currently under construction and will follow the current route of U.S. 77 in most places.

Adjacent counties
 Kleberg County (north)
 Willacy County (south)
 Hidalgo County (southwest)
 Brooks County (west)

National protected area
 Padre Island National Seashore (part)

Demographics

Note: the US Census treats Hispanic/Latino as an ethnic category. This table excludes Latinos from the racial categories and assigns them to a separate category. Hispanics/Latinos can be of any race.

As of the census in 2000, there were 414 people, 138 households, and 110 families residing in the county.  The population density was 0.28 people per square mile (0.11/km2).  There were 281 housing units at an average density of 0.19 per square mile (0.07/km2).  The racial makeup of the county was 64.49% White, 0.72% Black or African American, 0.72% Native American, 0.48% Asian, 31.88% from other races, and 1.69% from two or more races.  78.99% of the population were Hispanic or Latino of any race.

There were 138 households, out of which 35.50% had children under the age of 18 living with them, 58.70% were married couples living together, 10.90% had a female householder with no husband present, and 19.60% were non-families. 18.80% of all households were made up of individuals, and 6.50% had someone living alone who was 65 years of age or older.  The average household size was 2.97 and the average family size was 3.26.

In the county, the population had widespread age groups including 29.20% under the age of 18, 9.70% from 18 to 24, 26.30% from 25 to 44, 24.20% from 45 to 64, and 10.60% who were 65 years of age or older.  The median age was 34 years old. For every 100 females, there were 110.20 males. For every 100 females age 18 and over, there were 100.70 males.

The median income for a household in the county was $25,000, and the median income for a family was $26,719. Males had a median income of $18,125 versus $12,188 for females. The per capita income for the county was $17,959. 15.30% of the population and 9.90% of families were below the poverty line.  Out of the total people living in poverty, 15.60% are under the age of 18 and 18.80% are 65 or older.

Kenedy County, the third least populous county in Texas, had 108 times more cattle than people in 1999.

Education
Almost all of Kenedy County is served by Sarita Elementary School (PreK-6) of the Kenedy County Wide Common School District. As of 2001, of the schools in the nine Texas counties having only one school apiece, the population of Sarita Elementary School was the smallest. A small portion of Kenedy County is served by the Riviera Independent School District for all grades K-12. Students who graduate from Sarita Elementary move on to  De La Paz Middle School and Kaufer Early College High School, operated by Riviera ISD, which takes all secondary students from the KCWCSD area.

Del Mar College is the designated community college for all of Kenedy County.

Communities

Census-designated place
 Sarita (county seat)

Unincorporated community
 Armstrong

Politics
Like the rest of South Texas, Kenedy County regularly supported candidates from the Democratic Party. The Republican Party has carried the county only seven times since the 1928 presidential election. Despite its historic Democratic lean, the county has become competitive in recent years due to rural Hispanic voters becoming more open to voting Republican. In 2020, Donald Trump carried the county with over 65 percent of the vote and the strongest Republican margin since 1956, and Kenedy was one of only fifteen counties to flip from supporting Hillary Clinton in 2016 to Trump in 2020. Kenedy County has the longest losing streak in the nation, being the only county to flip from Barack Obama to Mitt Romney, then to Clinton, and then back to Trump in his unsuccessful second bid. Since 2000, the county has only voted for a single winner (Obama in 2008), and since 1980 it has only voted for one three times (Bill Clinton in both his campaigns as well as Obama in 2008). The county has also become Republican-leaning in non-presidential elections, as Republican Senator Ted Cruz won the county in his narrow 2018 victory over Beto O’Rourke and the county voted Republican in every statewide election in 2018. However, despite underperforming Joe Biden by 11 points, Democrat Dan Sanchez won the county in his loss to Republican Mayra Flores in the 2022 Texas's 34th district special election.

In statewide races for governor and the U.S. Senate, the county has slowly trended Republican. The last Democrat to carry the county in a gubernatorial race was Tony Sanchez in 2002, while Rick Noriega in 2008 is the last Democrat to carry it in a senatorial race.

See also

 List of museums in the Texas Gulf Coast
 National Register of Historic Places listings in Kenedy County, Texas
 Recorded Texas Historic Landmarks in Kenedy County

References

External links

 Kenedy County in Handbook of Texas Online at the University of Texas
 Inventory of county records, Kenedy County Courthouse, Sarita, Texas, hosted by the Portal to Texas History
 Kenedy County Profile from the Texas Association of Counties

 
1921 establishments in Texas
Populated places established in 1921
Kingsville, Texas micropolitan area
Majority-minority counties in Texas
Hispanic and Latino American culture in Texas